Andrea Migno (born 10 January 1996) is an Italian Grand Prix motorcycle racer. Migno has also been a competitor in the Italian Honda 125GP Trofeo, the Red Bull MotoGP Rookies Cup, and the CEV 125GP Championship.

Career statistics

Grand Prix motorcycle racing

By season

By class

Races by year
(key) (Races in bold indicate pole position, races in italics indicate fastest lap)

References

External links

1996 births
Living people
Italian motorcycle racers
Moto3 World Championship riders
Sportspeople from the Province of Rimini